In geometry, a pentahexagonal pyritoheptacontatetrahedron is a near-miss Johnson solid with pyritohedral symmetry. This near-miss was discovered by Mason Green in 2006. It has 6 hexagonal faces, 12 pentagonal faces, and 56 triangles in 3 symmetry positions. Mason calls it a hexagonally expanded snubbed dodecahedron.

With regular hexagons and pentagons it is a symmetrohedron. The triangles are not equilateral, with triangle-triangle edges compressed by 1.8%. 

It has 3 vertex configurations, 3.3.5.6, 3.5.3.6, 3.3.3.3.5, with the last shared in the snub dodecahedron.

See also
 Tetrated dodecahedron has tetrahedral symmetry

References

External links
Near Misses
24 Johnson Solid Near Misses

Polyhedra